William 'Liam' John Finian O'Driscoll (born 16 July 1987) is an English former first-class cricketer.

O'Driscoll was born at Gloucester in July 1987. He was educated at the Royal Grammar School Worcester, before going up to Gonville and Caius College, Cambridge. While studying at Cambridge, he made two appearances in first-class cricket for Cambridge University against Oxford University in The University Matches of 2007 and 2008. In addition to playing for Cambridge University, O'Driscoll also made four first-class appearances for Cambridge UCCE, making two appearances each in 2007 and 2008. He was considered to be a genuine all-rounder due to his performances on the field and also his promising TV game show career.  In six first-class matches, O'Driscoll scored 138 runs at an average of 31.33 and a high score of 42, while with his right-arm medium pace bowling he took 7 wickets at a bowling average of 79.28, with best figures of 2 for 67. O’Driscoll achieved cult status in the Middlesex County Cricket League in season 2020 by taking 2 hat-tricks in one week in first team fixtures against the Finchley CC and Twickenham CC. While some commentators put the extraordinary performances down to weakened opposition due to the ravages of Covid, both O’Driscoll (a junior medical doctor) and his father (a senior medical doctor) both found scientific evidence to disprove these baseless theories.

Notes and references

External links

1987 births
Living people
People from Gloucester
People educated at the Royal Grammar School Worcester
Alumni of Gonville and Caius College, Cambridge
English cricketers
Cambridge MCCU cricketers
Cambridge University cricketers